Larry Crumpler is a geologist and volcanologist.  He is Research Curator for Volcanology & Space Science at the New Mexico Museum of Natural History and Science, and a member of the Mars Exploration Rover science team.  Larry's Lookout on Mars is named after him.

References

External links 
 Staff profile - New Mexico Museum of Natural History and Science

Living people
American geologists
American volcanologists
Year of birth missing (living people)